Emerson Whithorne (birth surname Whittern) (September 6, 1884 in Cleveland, Ohio - March 25, 1958) was a notable American composer and researcher into the history of music. He had a reputation as an authority on the music of China. He wrote music criticism for Musical America and the Paul Mall Gazette.

Marriage to Ethel Leginska
In 1907 Whithorne was married to the English musician Ethel Leginska. They met whilst studying music in Vienna. Sometimes they performed duets together, with Whithorne playing the second part in two-piano pieces during her recitals. Whithorne acted as her concert manager for the first two years of their marriage. , and as a composer. Emerson Whithorne had one son with her, Cedric Whithorne, born in September 1908 after the couple returned to England after visiting the United States. They travelled to Cleveland, Ohio where Leginska made her unofficial American debut at Cleveland's Hippodrome, a vaudeville theater. The couple separated in 1910 and divorced in 1916. Ethel mounted an unsuccessful custody fight for her son Cedric,

Career
Whithorne served on the Council of the International Composers' Guild (ICG). His composition Greek Impressions was the opening piece for the very first of the concerts the ICG organised, held at Greenwich Village Theatre on 19 February 1922. A year later two of his compositions, Tears and Invocations received their world premiere at the Klaw Theatre, a Broadway theatre on 4 March 1923, also under the auspices of the ICG. However his piece was performed immediately prior to Edgard Varèse's Hyperprism which led to a riot. Following this there was a dispute between Claire Reis and Varèse about programming, and Whithorne left the ICG to join Reis's new organisation, the League of Composers.

Trivia
Whithorne lived for a period in London, staying until 1915. The Times reported that Whithorne was prosecuted for playing the pianoforte at unsocial hours. In November 1913 he won the case brought by the landlord of his South Kensington flat.

Partial List of Compositions 

 Greek Impressions
 Tears
 Invocation
 The Rain, Op. 12 No. 1
 Hototogisu, Op. 14 No. 1
 Put by the Lute, Op. 15 No. 1
 2 Chinese Poems, Op. 18 (1. Tears based on a Cranmer-Byng translation of a Wang Sang-Ju poem, dedicated to Frances Garrison, and 2. The Golden Nenuphar, based on Cranmer-Byng translation of a Han-zi poem)
 2 Chinese Nocturnes, Op. 34
 Aeroplane, Op. 38 No. 2 (dedicated to Rudolph Ganz)
 New York Days & Nights, Op. 40
 String Quartet, Op. 51
 Hommage, Op. 58 No. 2

References

External links
 

1884 births
1958 deaths
20th-century American historians
American male non-fiction writers
American classical composers
American male classical composers
American music historians
Classical musicians from Ohio
Musicians from Cleveland
Pupils of Theodor Leschetizky
Members of the International Composers' Guild
20th-century American male musicians
Historians from Ohio
20th-century American male writers